The Hohgrat (also known as Groot) is a mountain located on the border between the Swiss cantons of Thurgau and St. Gallen. Reaching a height of 996 metres above sea level, it is the highest point of the canton of Thurgau.

The mountain is densely forested, except the eastern (St. Gallen) side, which includes some limestone cliffs.

References

 Canton Thurgau - Geographic Location thurgau-turismus.ch

External links
Hohgrat on Hikr

Highest points of Swiss cantons
Mountains of the canton of St. Gallen
Mountains of Thurgau
Appenzell Alps
Mountains of Switzerland
Mountains of Switzerland under 1000 metres
St. Gallen–Thurgau border